Melpathur Narayana Bhattathiri ( Mēlpattūr Nārāyaṇa Bhaṭṭatiri; 1560–1646/1666), third student of Achyuta Pisharati, was a member of Madhava of Sangamagrama's Kerala school of astronomy and mathematics. He was a mathematical linguist (vyakarana). His most important scholarly work, Prakriya-sarvasvam, sets forth an axiomatic system elaborating on the classical system of Panini. However, he is most famous for his masterpiece, Narayaneeyam, a devotional composition in praise of Guruvayurappan (Krishna) that is still sung at Guruvayur Temple.

Birth and education 
Bhattathri was from a village named Melpathur at Kurumbathur in Athavanad Panchayat near Kadampuzha, very close to the Tirur River, as well as near to the holy town of Thirunavaya and Bharathappuzha, that was famed as the theatre of the Mamankam festival, in Malappuram district. He was born in 1560 in a pious Brahmin family, as the son of Mathrudattan Bhattathiri, a pandit himself. Bhattathiri studied from his father as a child. He learned the Rig Veda from Madhava, Tharka sastra (science of debate in Sanskrit) from Damodara and Vyakarana (Sanskrit grammar) from Achyuta Pisharati. He became a pandit by the age of 16. He married his guru Achuta Pisharati's niece and settled at Thrikkandiyur in Tirur.

He was one of the last mathematicians of the Sangamagrama school, which had been founded by Madhava in Kerala, South India and included among its members: Parameshvara, Neelakanta Somayaji, Jyeshtadeva, Achyuta Pisharati, Melpathur Narayana Bhattathiri and Achyuta Panikkar. It flourished between the 14th and 16th centuries and the original discoveries of the school seems to have ended with Bhattathiri.

It seems that he had a younger brother named after his father (Mathrudattan Jr.,). One of the manuscripts of Narayaneeyam says that it was copied by the author's younger brother Matrdatta. The Melpathur family is now extinct and it is said that it was merged into the Maravancheri Thekkedathu family.

Narayaneeyam 
The Narayaniyam is a devotional Sanskrit work, in the form of a poetical hymn, consisting of 1036 verses (called 'slokas' in Sanskrit). It was written by Bhattathiri in 1586 AD and gives a summary of 18,000 verses of the Bhagavata Purana.

Pisharadi has been affected by rheumatism. Unable to see his pain, by yogic strength and by way of Gurdakshina, Bhattathri is said to have taken the disease upon himself and relieved his guru. To relieve Narayana of this disease, Ezhuthachan, a Malayalam poet and Sanskrit scholar hinted- "meen thottu koottuka" (start with the fish). On the face of it, the suggestion would seem offensive to an orthodox Malayali Brahmin, who are strict vegetarians. However, Bhattathiri, understanding the hidden meaning, decided to present the various incarnations of Vishnu starting with the fish, as narrated in the Bhagavata Purana in a series of Dasakas (groups of ten slokas). Upon reaching Guruvayur, he started composing one dasaka a day in the presence of the Lord. The refrain in last sloka of every dasaka is a prayer to him to remove his ailments and sufferings. Every day, he sang 10 shlokas on Sri Guruvayoorappan. Each set of 10 poems ends with a prayer for early cure. In 100 days he finished his compositions, and his condition gradually improved day by day. On 27 November 1587 when he finished the last dashakam ("Ayuraarogya Sowkhyam") he was completely cured. The 100th canto composed on that day gives a graphic description of this form of the Lord from the head to the foot. On that day he had a vision of the Lord in the form of Venugopalan. He was 27 then. He was a propounder of Purva Mimamsa, Uttara Mimamsa and Vyakarana.

The Chakorasandesa which was earlier than Narayaneeyam also refers to rheumatic patients going to the Guruvayoor Temple. Worship in the Guruvayoor Temple is considered to be sure remedy for all diseases. It may be because of this belief that Bhattathiri went to Guruvayoor.There is another story saying that when Bhattathiri was about to finish his masterpiece Narayaneeyam. Bhattathiri pleaded to Lord Guruvayoorapan for the relief of his disease. Lord Guruvayoorapan appeared himself before Bhattathiri and showed Lord's two hand and said that one of his hands did have the power to cure his disease. And showed his other hand and said that it had Karunyam.
Bhattathiri thought for a moment and chose the hand which had Karunyam. 
He later explained that 
if we have Karunyam we all automatically get all the prosperity and well-being. 
Lord gave the Karunyam and it is said that Bhattathiri's disease was cured.

Friendship with Poonthanam
While Narayana Bhattathiri was composing Narayaneeyam in Guruvayur temple, Poonthanam, another great devotee of Lord Guruvayoorapa and also a poet who wrote many great works about Lord Guruvayoorapa including the njanappana in Malayalam, had also come there to worship Lord Guruvayoorapan. One day he took some of his poems of the njanappana to Bhattathiri in order to correct them and improve them, but this was dismissed by Bhattathiri with a haughty remark that Poonthanam didn't know the correct meaning of words and he didn't want to waste his time on such silly works. Later that night lord Guruvayoorapan himself appeared in Bhattathiri's dream and criticized him by saying that he preferred Poonthanam's bhakthi than Bhattathiri 's knowledge. And then the next day itself Bhattathiri apologized to poonthanam and corrected mistakes then they became friends.

Works
He wrote on diverse subjects including scientific ones. His works are:
 Narayaniyam
 Kriyakrama or Asvalayanakriyakrama
 Prakriyasarvasva
 Sripadasaptati (Supposed to be his last work)
 Dhatukavya 
 Svahasudhakara 
 Matsyavatara
 Rajasuya
 Ashtamicampu (fine description of Astami festival celebrated in the month of Krithigai (Nov-Dec) in the Shiva temple at Vaikom in north Travancore.
 Dutavakya
 Subhadradharana
 Pancalisvayamvara

Under the patronage of Cochin Vira Keralavarman (1601-1615 A.D) Melputtur wrote the Gosrinagaravarnana and Virakeralaprasasti.

Death
It is said that Bhattathiri lived at least for 86 years, since his wish was to have a happy, healthy, long life as seen at the end of Narayaneeyam. One poem says that he lived for 106 years, and accordingly he should have died in 1666. But, 86 is considered more reliable. Accordingly, he lived in many places after his cure of rheumatism, like Kochi, Ambalapuzha, Kozhikode and finally he settled in Mookkola near Changaramkulam in the present-day Malappuram district. He stayed in the Devi temple there for around 20 years, and he wrote his last work there. One day, after returning from Mookkola Temple, he collapsed and died instantly. Thus, he had a peaceful end as he wished.

There is a monument in the name of Melpathur Bhattathiripad still in the village where he was born and is known as Melpathur illaparambu.

References

Indian Hindus
1560 births
1646 deaths
Scientists from Kerala
Malayali people
Kerala school of astronomy and mathematics
17th-century Indian mathematicians
People from Malappuram district
16th-century Indian mathematicians
Poets from Kerala
17th-century Indian poets
16th-century Indian poets
Scholars from Kerala
People from Guruvayur